Agia Paraskevi is a village and a community of the Meteora municipality. Since the 2011 local government reform it was part of the community of Aspropotamos, of which it was a communal district. The 2011 census recorded 69 residents in the village. The community of Agia Paraskevi covers an area of 29.641 km2.

Aromanians of Agia Paraskevi
The local Aromanians of Agia Paraskevi call themselves in singular armâń gurțań. A particularity of the Aromanian dialect in Agia Paraskevi, who speak a Pindus dialect, is that they have preserved the Latin word for flower, floare, as opposed to the majority of Aromanians that call it lilice or chitcă. They are all Orthodox Christians who worship at the Meteora monasteries located nearby to the village.

See also
 List of settlements in the Trikala regional unit

References

Populated places in Trikala (regional unit)
Aromanian settlements in Greece